Osteomeles subrotunda is a species of plant native to China and the Ryukyu islands of Japan. It has edible fruits that can be eaten raw. The fruit has a sweet flavor. It is grown as an ornamental plant. It is also used in bonsai.

References

External links
 Osteomeles subrotunda at Plants for a Future

subrotunda
Flora of China